Roberto Deodoro Guerra (born August 12, 1953) is an attorney and a Democratic member of the Texas House of Representatives. He has represented District 41 since winning a special election in 2012.

Texas House of Representatives
Guerra sits on the House Committees on Public Health, Insurance, and Local & Consent Calendars.

Education
He graduated from Pan American University in 1977 with a bachelor's degree and a double major in biology and chemistry. In 1985, he graduated with cum laude honors from the Thurgood Marshall School of Law.

References

External links
Legislative page
 Robert Guerra at the Texas Tribune

Democratic Party members of the Texas House of Representatives
Texas lawyers
Hispanic and Latino American state legislators in Texas
Living people
Thurgood Marshall School of Law alumni
University of Texas–Pan American alumni
People from Edinburg, Texas
21st-century American politicians
1953 births